Wikitongues is an American non-profit organization registered in the state of New York. It aims to sustain and promote all the languages in the world.  It was founded by Frederico Andrade, Daniel Bögre Udell and Lindie Botes in 2014.

Oral histories

By May 2016, Wikitongues had recorded around 329 videos in over 200 languages. As of 2018, they have recorded more than 350 languages, or 5% of the languages in the world. They also have 15% of their videos subtitled through the organization Amara, formerly known as Universal Subtitles, which is a web-based non-profit project that hosts and allows user-subtitled video to be accessed and created.

Poly
Poly is open source software built to share and learn languages. The project was supported on Kickstarter and the organization was able to raise US$52,716 with the help of 429 backers. Currently the software is under development.

Licenses
All the videos are released under CC BY-NC 4.0 license. Recently, another option to release the video under CC BY-SA 4.0 has also been introduced.

Mission
In 2019, Daniel Bögre Udell, one of the Wikitongues founders, gave a talk on TED Residency stage about the project and its mission, called "How to save a language from extinction."

References

Further media

External links
 

Non-profit organizations based in New York City
Organizations established in 2014
Linguistics organizations
Linguistic research
Language revival
2014 establishments in New York City